Ķegums Municipality is a former municipality in Latvia. The municipality was formed in 2002 by merging Rembate parish and Ķegums town with its countryside territory. In 2009 it absorbed Birzgale parish, too the administrative centre being Ķegums.

On 1 July 2021, Ķegums Municipality ceased to exist and its territory was merged into Ogre Municipality.

See also 
 Administrative divisions of Latvia (2009)

References 

 
Former municipalities of Latvia